Shane Christopher Lundgren (born March 21, 1961) is an American aviator, and businessman who is the CEO of Metolius Aviation Capital.  Shane has been active in commercial aviation operations, aircraft and engine leasing, and finance throughout his career.

A Fellow of the Royal Geographical Society and member of the Explorers Club Lundgren has led a number of aviation focused expeditions.

Early life
Lundgren was born in Palo Alto, California. He attended the University of San Diego and received a degree in economics and history in 1984. Concurrently he attended National Air College and obtained his Commercial Pilot License, Instrument Rating, Multi-Engine Rating and Instructors Flight Rating. In 1982, at 21 years of age, he was checked out in the Boeing 737 by Air Berlin USA, founded by father Kim Lundgren in Berlin, Germany. At the time, Shane was the youngest person to fly the 737 commercially.

Career
Lundgren flew as a captain for Air Berlin from 1982 through 2012. With the fall of the Berlin wall he worked with his father during the transition of the company from being a US flag carrier to a German airline, the only airline in history to change nationality. After the IPO in 2006 and the sale of shares to Etihad in 2012 he departed Air Berlin.

In 1998 Lundgren went to work for Pembroke Capital in Dublin Ireland where he began to work in commercial aircraft leasing and finance. Lundgren led the North Pole Flight sponsored by Pembroke Capital. From 2000-2012 he was actively involved in aircraft asset sales and leases from the Air Berlin fleet.  He is currently the CEO of Metolius Aviation Capital, which he founded in 2015, and is a private investor in commercial aviation assets for high net worth individuals and institutions.

Expeditions

During extensive travels in Russia after the fall of the Berlin Wall, Lundgren conceived a trans-Siberian flight (barnstorming style) in Russian Antonov An-2 biplanes. In 1994, he led the first "online expedition," sponsored by WIRED magazine, Magnavox, and Apple. The flight began in Moscow and proceeded north of the Arctic Circle across Siberia to Magadan. In 1995, the Smithsonian Institution's Arctic Studies Center joined Lundgren in another flying expedition to chronicle indigenous people from Yakutsk to Alaska across the Bering Straits. Discovery Online was launched through this expedition. Lundgren went on to found WorldSight, an early online magazine.

Lundgren led polar expeditions in 1997 and 1998, and was filmed by National Geographic Television in a documentary about the original polar flights. 

His Expedition Aircraft, the Antonov An-2 is now in the Boeing Museum of Flight, Aviation Pavilion.

Civic
Lundgren served on the Black Butte School Board from 2007-2017, and was also the President of the Black Butte School Foundation, which funds scholarships to local students annually.

Family
Lundgren's Great Grandfather was John Adam Zehntbauer, founder of Jantzen in Portland in 1915. His father Kim Lundgren founded Air Berlin in 1978.

Notes

Citations 

1961 births
American aviators
American explorers
Commercial aviators
Living people
People from Palo Alto, California
University of San Diego alumni